Pune Peshwas was an Indian professional basketball team located in Pune, India. The team last competed in India's UBA Pro Basketball League.

Players

Notable players
To appear in this section a player must have either:
- Set a club record or won an individual award as a professional player
- Played at least one official international match for his senior national team 
 Amritpal Singh 
 Arshpreet Bhullar
 Akash Lokhande
 Siddhant Shinde

Miscellaneous
Notable fans of the team included Himesh Reshammiya who performed at a halftime show in 2016 and actor Neil Nitin Mukesh. and Shreyas Shintre who played kathak in the 4th season.

References

External links
Presentation at Asia-basket.com
Facebook

Basketball teams in India
Basketball in Pune
Basketball in Maharashtra
Basketball teams established in 2015